Cinco Ranch High School (CRHS)  is a public school located in an unincorporated area in Fort Bend County, Texas, United States that serves grades 9 through 12 as part of the Katy Independent School District. It is located off Cinco Ranch Boulevard within the community of Cinco Ranch; it is in the Cinco Ranch census-designated place. The school opened in 1999. The principal is Dr. Kaye Williams.

The school was rated the 3rd best high school in 2007 tied with Clements High School in the Houston region by the Houston Chronicle. In 2010, Cinco Ranch High School was ranked 478th out of America's top 2,000 public high schools.

The school was named a National Blue Ribbon School in 2008.

History
Cinco Ranch High School opened in the fall of 1999 after a $143 million bond issue was passed in the spring of 1996 and another $324 million bond was passed in 1999 allowing for funding. In the initial years, the school played host to displaced students from other Katy ISD schools including 8th graders displaced by overcrowding at Beck Junior High School in the 1999-2000 school year. Other re-locations include students from West Memorial Elementary that moved to Cinco Ranch after the elementary encountered mold related issues in 2002.

The original building, built in 1999, has been expanded. It consists of a central rotunda, where the cafeteria, offices, and library are located. Attached to this are two long hallways running in opposite directions, which house classrooms. At the end of one of the hallways are the athletic facilities, including a natatorium, workout facility, gymnasiums, fields, and a stadium. At the end of the other hallway, on the opposite end of the school, are the fine arts rehearsal facilities, black box theatre, and the freshman center. The original facility was built on a  site by PBK Architects to support a maximum of 2,800 students.

The school benefited from the expanding budgets of KISD, which could be attributed to rapid growth in the surrounding areas and the addition of Katy Mills Mall, which, through taxes, gave a large boost to KISD funds. In 2001, many of the KISD high schools received renovations, and all received new performing arts centers (PACs). The KISD high schools also received additions of ninth grade centers, which may be attributed to the belief by the district that younger students benefit from an eased transition into high school. The PAC and 9th Grade Center were added to the fine arts end of the hallway at a cost of $11,356,050. The addition of the Performing Arts Center has improved the quality of both theatrical and musical productions. The department includes the orchestra, choir, band, visual arts, and theater productions.

The secondary expansion, along with 9th grade gyms and offices, made for a very long and narrow two-story building with a total length of one quarter mile. This "tunnel effect" creates an environment for indoor running in the summer.

State championships

2004 Texas 5-A Boys' Track & Field State Champions
2005 Texas 5-A Boys' Track & Field State Champions
2006 Texas 5-A UIL Lincoln Douglas Debate Champion
2007 Texas 5-A UIL Lincoln Douglas Debate Champion
2007 Texas 5-A Wrestling State Champions 
2010 Texas 5-A UIL News Writing Champion, also winning Tops of Texas
2016 Texas 6-A Women’s Wrestling State Champions
2020 Texas 6-A D1 UIL Spirit State Champions.

Academics
In April 2007, Cinco Ranch was rated by the Houston Chronicle as the third best high school in the Houston area, preceded only by the High School for Performing and Visual Arts (HSPVA) and YES College Preparatory. Included in this ranking were TAKS scores, graduation rates, ACT, SAT, and AP testing rates and scores, class size, teacher experience, and percentage of students from poor families.

In 2008, Cinco Ranch was named a National Blue Ribbon School.

Extracurricular activities

Athletics
In 2007, the Cinco Ranch Wrestling team won the University Interscholastic League Texas State Championships for high school wrestling.

Cheerleading
Cinco Ranch High School's cheer team won the Class 6A Div 1 UIL State Championship in 2020.

Debate
The Cinco Ranch Debate Team won the 5A UIL State Championship in Lincoln-Douglas Debate in both 2006 and 2007. Now, the team is centered around Public Forum.

Journalism
The 2001-2002 yearbook, Panorama, made news. When the yearbook publisher agreed to reprint the book with various corrections, school administrators asked that some essays be removed. These included an essay about a homosexual student “coming out”. A school administrator said that the yearbook was not an appropriate platform for the story. The yearbook was printed without the essay.

Robotics

The Cinco Ranch FRC Robotics Team 624, CRyptonite, has consistently been the top Katy ISD team. They have over 10 Blue Banners, consistently remaining in the top 10 teams in Texas. In 2015, CRyptonite finished 9th in the World by the end of the season.

Feeder patterns
The following elementary schools feed into Cinco Ranch High School:
 Fielder Elementary School
 Williams Elementary School
 Creech Elementary School
 Exley Elementary School (partial)
 Griffin Elementary School (partial)
 Rylander Elementary School (partial)
 Cimarron Elementary School (partial)

The following junior high schools feed into Cinco Ranch High School:
 Beck Junior High School
 Cinco Ranch Junior High School (partial)
 West Memorial Junior High School (partial)

Enrollment trends
After opening, Cinco Ranch High School steadily grew to over 3,600 students due to the rapid expansion of the Katy area. However, enrollment has decreased due to the opening of nearby Seven Lakes High School in 2005. Cinco Ranch High School's maximum capacity is 3,000 students.

1999-2000 = 828
2000-2001 = 1,541
2001-2002 = 2,300
2002-2003 = 2,745
2003-2004 = 3,235
2004-2005 = 3,601
2005-2006 = 3,288
2006-2007 = 3,070
2007-2008 = 2,788
2008-2009 = 2,840
2009-2010 = 2,872
2010-2011 = 2,989
2011-2012 = 3,056
2012-2013 = 3,101
2013-2014 = 3,194
2014-2015 = 3,167

Demographics
For the 2011-12 school year:

 Black: 6.3%
 Hispanic: 19.9%
 White: 58.0%
 American Indian: 0.1%
 Asian: 14.4%
 Pacific Islander: 0.1%
 Two or More Races: 1.1%
 Economically Disadvantaged: 9.8%

Newsweek Ranking
Newsweek annually ranks the top 2,000 public high schools in the nation out of the approximately 27,000 that exist in the country. Cinco Ranch has made this list for at least the past five years.

2017 = 971th
2014 = 298th
2013 = 477th
2012 = 354th
2011 = unranked
2010 = 500th
2009 = 468th
2008 = 968th
2007 = 515th
2006 = 676th

References and footnotes

External links
 

Educational institutions established in 1999
Public high schools in Fort Bend County, Texas
Katy Independent School District high schools
1999 establishments in Texas